Bucculatrix alaternella is a moth species in the family Bucculatricidae. The species was first described in 1890 by Alexandre Constant. It is found in France, Spain and Portugal.

The wingspan is about 9 mm.

The larvae feed on Rhamnus alaternus. They mine the leaves of their host plant. The mine has the form of a slender, tortuous gallery. The frass is deposited in the gallery and the larval chamber. Later, larvae live freely on the leaf, causing window feeding. Larvae can be found from October to November.

References

Natural History Museum Lepidoptera generic names catalog

Bucculatricidae
Moths described in 1890
Moths of Europe
Leaf miners